This is a list of York University people. It includes notable graduates and faculty of the Toronto, Ontario, Canada institution, as well as graduates of Osgoode Hall Law School prior to its affiliation with York.

Graduates

Politicians 
Osgoode Hall Law School has been associated with York University since 1969. For graduates before that date, see Notable alumni of Osgoode Hall.

Judges

Business leaders

Artists and entertainers

Scientists

Athletes 

Alon Badat (born 1989), Israeli soccer player
 Ari Taub (born 1971), Olympic Greco-Roman wrestler

Broadcasters

Other

Notable faculty

Engineering

Other 

Sam Schachter (born 1990), Olympic volleyball player, and volleyball coach

Distinguished Research Professors / University Professors 

The rank of "Distinguished Research Professor" and "University Professor" are the highest ranks a professor can achieve at York University. There are a maximum of 25 active Distinguished Research Professors and active University Professors at any time. It is awarded to members of the faculty who have made outstanding contributions to the university through their work in research.

Presidents

Chancellors

References 

York University
York